The Park Estate is a private residential housing estate to the west of Nottingham city centre, England. It is noted for its Victorian architecture, although many of the houses have been altered, extended or converted into flats. The estate uses gas street lighting, which is believed to be one of the largest networks in Europe.

History

The Park Estate started life as a forested deer park situated immediately to the west of Nottingham Castle. The castle was, from its construction in 1087 until 1663, a royal castle, and the adjoining park a royal park. As well as deer, the park containing fish ponds and a rabbit warren, whilst King Henry II, who was reported to be 'addicted to hunting beyond measure', added a falconry. The park would have provided both food and sport for castle residents. After the capture of the castle by parliamentary forces during the English Civil War, the park's trees were felled to provide fuel and supplies to the garrison, and in 1651 the castle was slighted.

In 1663, the ruined castle and park was bought by William Cavendish, 1st Duke of Newcastle. He initially re-stocked the park with deer, but by the 1720s the area had been given over for cattle grazing. In 1800, whilst Henry Pelham-Clinton, 4th Duke of Newcastle was still a minor, his mother considered disposing of the park. Her agents advised against such a sale as they thought it would depress land values in Nottingham, and they recommended instead a gradual sale of small plots on the periphery of the park. The first domestic building in the park was built in 1809. Built opposite the castle gatehouse, the building served as the vicarage to St. Mary's Church.

With the industrialisation of Nottingham in the 19th century, the Park became a valuable open space for local people. Notwithstanding this, and despite much opposition from locals who regarded the area as public land, major development began in 1822 under the 4th Duke. Initially he engaged the architect John Jephson, but in 1825 Jephson was replaced by Peter Frederick Robinson, who published a plan for the park in 1827. The first houses appeared on Park Terrace around 1829 and by 1832 some 40–50 had been completed. Despite this development, in 1849 The Stranger's Guide noted that the park was 'open to the public and is used as a promenade by all classes of society, and a most healthy appendage it is to a populous and closely built town'.

Development continued under the 5th Duke, who appointed architect Thomas Chambers Hine in 1854 to design many of the houses and by 1859 houses were complete on Castle Grove, Lenton Road, Newcastle Drive and Clinton Terrace. Hine remained as the architect to the estate, even after the death of the 5th Duke in 1864, when the estate was managed by a trust. Many of the large villas were built for local wealthy industrialists and businessmen, who employed their own architects. The designs for all houses still had to be approved by Hine until he retired in 1891. Hine was also responsible for the construction of the Park Tunnel, intended to provide access for horse-drawn carriages to Derby Road.

By 1918 the estate was largely completed with 355 houses. By the mid 1930s the larger houses were proving difficult to sell. Many of the remaining leases were very short. St Heliers, the former home of Jesse Boot, 1st Baron Trent, which had been unoccupied for 10 years, and was reported as being in good condition, was sold by auction by Walker, Walton and Hanson on 15 June 1932. Originally costing some £6,000, Herbert Weightman of Wilford, a jobbing builder, bought the property for £7. The ground rent payable to the Newcastle Estate Office was £116 per year. There were understood to be covenants in place preventing its demolition, but it was pulled down in 1936.

In 1938, the 8th Duke sold The Park to the Nuffield Trust who then sold it to Oxford University. Between 1940 and 1986 Oxford University sold the freeholds to the owners. The Park was designated a conservation area in 1969. In 1986 negotiations between The Park Residents Association and Oxford University Chest resulted in the ownership of the Estate being transferred to the newly formed Company: The Nottingham Park Estate Limited.

By 2007, all but about a dozen of the 355 original pre-1918 houses still existed, many without any significant external alterations.

Architecture

The following table lists the significant properties within the park estate.

Planning constraints
The Park is a conservation area with many of the buildings being listed. Planning submissions are subject to detailed planning regulations.

Residential estate

Access
Access to the estate for vehicles is restricted to three entrances – North Road (off Derby Road), Lenton Road (next to castle) and Peveril Drive (off Castle Boulevard) where registration with The Estate's ANPR system is required to operate the rising bollards. There are also two minor entrances – Barrack Lane (off Derby Road) and Newcastle Drive/Park Row (off The Ropewalk) – that provide access to selected parts of the estate, although Barrack Lane itself does not fall within The Park.

There are several pedestrian/cycle entrances which are mostly gated, some of which locked at night. These are: Lenton Road (on to Park Road, Lenton); Lenton Road (next to Rock Drive: a steep walkway to Castle Boulevard); Fish Pond Drive (on to Castle Boulevard); Newcastle Drive (off Canning Circus) and The Park Tunnel which runs from Tunnel Road to Derby Road (near Budgens store) with a staircase halfway along to Upper College Street. There is a gated walkway from Pelham Crescent to Harlaxton Drive, Lenton

From 1999 to 2013 the pedestrian gate between Lenton Road and Park Road, Lenton was locked every night between the hours of 11 pm and 5 am. The estate management argued this was necessary to reduce late night noise and anti-social behaviour, because the route links student-dominated Lenton to the city centre. A public local inquiry was held in 2013 to consider the legal status of Lenton Road, which ruled that it was a public right of way as a public footpath had been present since at least 1700, so should be added to the council's Definitive Map and could not be legally barred with a locked gate. This resulted in the removal of the gate between Lenton Road and Park Road.

Maintenance arrangements
The Park is a private estate, managed by Nottingham Park Estate Ltd, a company governed by Act of Parliament. Living on the estate incurs both council tax and a local charge ('Park Rates'). The park rates cover maintenance of roads, pavements, the gas light network, the trees and the public green spaces. Residents previously received a reduced council tax bill due to these rates covering services which would usually provided by the council. However, the Park Estate rate is now paid in addition to the full council tax rate.

Residents' Association
The Nottingham Park Residents' Association (NPRA) holds regular talks and hosts a number of events using the two green spaces in the middle of the estate. They also produce a twice yearly magazine which is delivered, free of charge, to every Park household.

In 2011 the NPRA hosted a street party on the day of the Royal Wedding, and, in 2012, a Diamond Jubilee Street Party. Other events include a picnic for young children based on the Teddy Bear picnic song, a Carol Service and Boule tournament. Every two years in June a number of the gardens are open to the public, with the proceeds being donated to local charities.

Neighbouring areas
 Lenton to the West
 Radford to the North
 Nottingham City Centre to the East

References

Bibliography
 The Park Estate, Nottingham, by Ken Brand. Published by Nottingham Civic Society as part of its "Get to know Nottingham" series.
 Fothergill: A Catalogue of the Works of Watson Fothergill, Architect by Darren Turner. Published by DT:P 2012.

External links

 http://www.thenottinghamparkestateltd.co.uk
 http://www.parknews.co.uk
 http://www.nottinghamcity.gov.uk/cdpl-park-ca-plan.pdf

Nottingham
Areas of Nottingham
Conservation areas in Nottinghamshire